Dialectica imperialella is a moth of the family Gracillariidae. It is found from Denmark to the Pyrenees, Italy and Romania and from Great Britain to Russia and Ukraine.

Adults are on wing in May and June in one generation.

The larvae feed on Buglossoides purpurocaerulea, Lithospermum officinale, Pulmonaria angustifolia, Pulmonaria officinalis and Symphytum officinale. They mine the leaves of their host plant. The mine consists of a small, lower-surface spiralling corridor that soon becomes a blotch that overruns the previous corridor. Gradually, the mine becomes deeper, and finally is full depth locally. At the underside the mine is quite larger and membranous. The frass is initially deposited in strings, but later it becomes a network of thin threads. Pupation usually takes place outside of the mine.

References

Dialectica (moth)
Moths of Europe
Moths of Asia
Moths described in 1847